Queen Adelaide usually refers to Adelaide of Saxe-Meiningen (1792–1849), the British queen consort of William IV.

Queen Adelaide may also refer to:

People
Saint Adelaide of Italy, also called Adelaide of Burgundy (931/932–999), queen of Italy and Germany
Adelaide of Paris (died 901), queen of the West Franks
Adelaide of Aquitaine (died 1004), queen of the Franks
Adelaide del Vasto (c. 1075–1118), queen of Jerusalem
Adelaide of Maurienne (1092–1154), queen of the Franks
Adelaide of Vohburg (1125–1187), queen of Germany
Adelaide of Champagne (1140–1206), queen of the Franks
Adelaide of Löwenstein-Wertheim-Rosenberg (1831–1909), wife of Miguel I of Portugal after his deposition

Places
Queen Adelaide, Cambridgeshire, England
Queen Adelaide Province, former name of British Kaffraria in South Africa

Buildings
The Queen Adelaide, a pub in Shepherd's Bush, London
The Queen Adelaide (Bethnal Green), a pub in Bethnal Green, London

See also
Adelaide (disambiguation)